1940 Whipple is a carbonaceous background asteroid from the outer region of the asteroid belt, approximately  in diameter. It was discovered on 2 February 1975, by the Harvard College Observatory at its George R. Agassiz Station near Harvard, Massachusetts, in the United States, and named after astronomer Fred Whipple.

Classification and orbit 

Whipple orbits the Sun in the outer main-belt at a distance of 2.9–3.3 AU once every 5 years and 4 months (1,956 days). Its orbit has an eccentricity of 0.06 and an inclination of 7° with respect to the ecliptic. The first used observation was made at Goethe Link Observatory in 1962, extending the asteroid's observation arc by 13 years prior to its discovery observation.

Naming 

This minor planet was named after American astronomer Fred Lawrence Whipple (1906–2004), author of the icy conglomerate model, also known as the dirty snowball hypothesis.

Whipple worked at the Harvard College Observatory for over 70 years and was the director of the Smithsonian Astrophysical Observatory where he developed new methods imaging meteors. He was also president of several commissions at the International Astronomical Union and on NASA's panel for missions to small Solar System bodies. The official  was published by the Minor Planet Center on 1 June 1975.

Physical characteristics 

Whipple has been characterized as a carbonaceous C-type asteroid by Pan-STARRS photometric survey.

Diameter and albedo 

According to the surveys carried out by the Infrared Astronomical Satellite IRAS, the Japanese Akari satellite, and NASA's Wide-field Infrared Survey Explorer with its subsequent NEOWISE mission, the asteroid measures between 32.6 and 40.4 kilometers in diameter and its surface has a low albedo between 0.04 and 0.06. The Collaborative Asteroid Lightcurve Link derives an albedo of 0.056 and a diameter of 33.8 kilometers using an absolute magnitude of 11.1.

Lightcurves 

In December 2011, a rotational lightcurve was obtained for this asteroid from photometric observations by American astronomer Russel Durkee at the Shed of Science Observatory. It gave a well-defined rotation period of  hours with a brightness variation of 0.25 magnitude, superseding a period of  hours previously obtained by French astronomer René Roy in 2005.

References

External links 
 Asteroid Lightcurve Database (LCDB), query form (info )
 Dictionary of Minor Planet Names, Google books
 Asteroids and comets rotation curves, CdR – Observatoire de Genève, Raoul Behrend
 Discovery Circumstances: Numbered Minor Planets (1)-(5000) – Minor Planet Center
 
 

001940
001940
Named minor planets
19750202